Socet may refer to:

Socet, a village in Șinteu Commune, Bihor County, Romania
Socet, a village in Cerbăl Commune, Hunedoara County, Romania